Botond Litkey (born 2 June 1967) is a Hungarian sailor. He competed in the men's 470 event at the 1996 Summer Olympics.

References

External links
 

1967 births
Living people
Hungarian male sailors (sport)
Olympic sailors of Hungary
Sailors at the 1996 Summer Olympics – 470
People from Balmazújváros
Sportspeople from Hajdú-Bihar County